Alice Arno, (born June 29, 1946) is a French actress, nudist and model, best known for her roles in European sexploitation and horror film genre.

Movie career 
Arno (who was raised in a family of nudists) worked as a nude model (posing for Pop, Men, Topfilm...) when she began her film career in 1969 at the age of 22. In 1972, she played the lead role in Justine de Sade, Claude Pierson's film adaptation of the Marquis de Sade's 1791 novel Justine. She became, along with Lina Romay and Monica Swinn, one of the most popular figures of European exploitation film, working for Eurociné and for Robert de Nesle's Comptoir Français de Productions Cinématographiques. She appeared in twelve erotic horror movies directed by Jesús Franco and is best remembered for playing the titular role in Franco's The Perverse Countess (1974), an erotic remake of the classic 1932 film The Most Dangerous Game.

She appeared in ten films with her sister Chantal Broquet, who also worked as a model and actress in low-budget European film productions. Chantal only appeared in three Franco films, The Obscene Mirror and his two Maciste films. They both quit the film industry after the advent of hardcore pornography. Alice Arno stopped making films in 1977, at age 31. (Chantal retired from films in 1975.)

Filmography  of  Alice Arno 
1967 :  Les Poneyttes directed by Joël Le Moigné
1968 :  Nathalie, l'amour s'éveille directed by Pierre Chevalier
1970 :  The Sicilian Clan directed by  Henri Verneuil ... a model
1970 :  L'amour, oui! Mais... directed by Philippe Schneider and  Joël Lifschutz
1970 :  Eugenie de Sade (a.k.a. Eugenie Sex Happening) directed by Jess Franco, released in 1973
1971 :  Señora casada necesita joven bien dotado directed by Juan Xiol
1971 :  Atout sexe directed by Max Kalifa
1971 :  La Débauche directed by Jean-François Davy
1971 :  L'argent et l'amour directed by Jean Lévitte
1971 :  Le Casse directed by Henri Verneuil
1972 :  Lâchez les chiennes directed by Bernard Launois
1972 :  Justine de Sade directed by Claude Pierson
1972 :  L'insatisfaite directed by Jean-Marie Pallardy
1973 :  Les aventures galantes de Zorro directed by Gilbert Roussel
1973 :  Tendre et perverse Emanuelle / Tender and Perverse Emanuelle directed by Jess Franco
1973 :  Maciste contre la reine des Amazones ( Lustful Amazons / Maciste vs the Amazon Queen) directed by Jess Franco
1973 :  Les gloutonnes (The Erotic Adventures of Maciste in Atlantis) directed by Jess Franco
1973 :  Le Miroir cochon  (a.k.a. The Other Side of the Mirror) - this was the adult x-rated version of Jess Franco's The Other Side of the Mirror
1973 :  Pigalle carrefour des illusions directed by Pierre Chevalier
1973 :  The Bare-Breasted Countess  (a.k.a. Female Vampire,  a.k.a. Erotikill) directed by Jess Franco
1973 :  Avortement clandestin ! directed by Pierre Chevalier
1973 :  Les Infidèles directed by Christian Lara ... the maid
1973 :  Ah! Si mon moine voulait... directed by Claude Pierson
1973 :  Les Gourmandines directed by Guy Pérol
1973 :  A Virgin Among the Living Dead (Arno appeared in an erotic insert that was later added to this 1971 film when it was released as Christina, Princess of Eroticism in France in 1973); director Jess Franco did not direct or approve of the added scenes
1973 :  Plaisir à trois / Pleasure for Three (a.k.a. How to Seduce a Virgin)  directed by Jess Franco ... Martine Bressac
1973 :  Les Nuits brûlantes de Linda / Linda's Hot Nights  (a.k.a. Who Raped Linda?) directed by Jess Franco : credited as Marie-France Bertrand
1973 :  La comtesse perverse (a.k.a. The Perverse Countess)  directed by Jess Franco ...Countess Ivanna Zaroff
1974 :  Règlements de femmes à O.Q. Corral directed by Jean-Marie Pallardy
1974 :  Convoy of Women directed by Pierre Chevalier
1974 :  Chicas de alquiler directed by Ignacio F. Iquino
1974 :  Kiss Me Killer (a.k.a. Sexy Blues) directed by  Jess Franco
1975 :  Des Filles dans une Cage Doree (a.k.a. Women in a Golden Cage) directed by Jess Franco and Marius Lesoeur
1975 :  L'Arrière-train sifflera trois fois directed by Jean-Marie Pallardy ... Calamity Jane / Gilda
1975 :  La Pipe au bois directed by Maxime Debest ... Margot
1975 :  Il Torcinaso directed by Giancarlo Romitelli
1975 :  Les Orgies du Golden Saloon directed by Gilbert Roussel : Heplabelle
1975 :  Hard Core Story directed by Guy Maria : Mireille
1975 :  Les Karatéchattes directed by Guy Maria : Michèle
1976 :  Chaleur et jouissance  (the hardcore adult version of  Double Face) directed by Riccardo Freda
1976 :  Paris Porno directed by Jacques Orth
1976 :  Et si tu n'en veux pas directed by Jacques Besnard
1977 :  Bouches gourmandes directed by André Koob... GretaYoung

Filmography  of  Chantal Broquet 
 1968 :  Nathalie, l'amour s'éveille directed by Pierre Chevalier
 1969 :  La Punition (ou Trafic de filles) directed by Jean Maley
 1971 :  Señora casada necesita joven bien dotado directed by Juan Xiol
 1972 :  Lâchez les chiennes directed by Bernard Launois
 1972 :  Justine de Sade directed by Claude Pierson
 1973 :  Maciste contre la reine des Amazones (Maciste vs the Amazon Queen) a.k.a. The Lustful Amazons, directed by Jess Franco
 1973 :  Les gloutonnes;  a.k.a. Les exploits érotiques de Maciste dans l'Atlantide / The Erotic Exploits of Maciste in Atlantis;  directed by Jess Franco
 1973 :  Le Miroir cochon (The Obscene Mirror) - this was the adult x-rated version of Jesus Franco's The Other Side of the Mirror
 1973 :  Pigalle carrefour des illusions directed by Pierre Chevalier
 1973 :  Les gourmandines directed by Guy Pérol
 1974 :  Hommes de joie pour femmes vicieuses directed by Pierre Chevalier
 1975 :  La dévoreuse directed by André Teisseire
 1975 :  Les orgies du Golden Saloon directed by Gilbert Roussel

References

External links
 

French film actresses
1946 births
Living people